"Not Fade Away" is the 22nd and final episode of season 5, and the series finale of the television show Angel.  Written by series creator Joss Whedon and directed and co-written by Jeffrey Bell, it was originally broadcast on May 19, 2004 on the WB network. In "Not Fade Away", Angel convinces his team that they must take out every member of the Circle of the Black Thorn in a defiant and probably futile stand against the Senior Partners of Wolfram & Hart. He tells his team to make the most of what may be their last day on Earth: Gunn visits his old neighborhood; Wesley tends to the wounded Illyria; Lorne spends some time onstage; Spike performs poetry at an open mic, and Angel visits his son.  When night falls, the team divides and sets out to eliminate the members of the Black Thorn, incurring the wrath of the armies of hell.

Plot 
Angel briefs his team on his plan to kill all the members of the Circle of the Black Thorn. Marcus Hamilton calls Angel to an emergency meeting of the circle, where the other members express doubts about Angel's loyalties. Angel proves himself to them by irrevocably renouncing his role in the Shanshu Prophecy, thereby giving up his chance to become human. Back at Wolfram & Hart, Angel meets with his old enemy Lindsey McDonald and enlists him in the planned attack on the Circle. He then tells the rest of his group that the plan will proceed that night. Lorne has serious reservations about Angel's plan, and his mood is dark and somber.

Angel advises his friends to spend the rest of the day as if it were their last, surmising that they will most likely not survive that night. Angel visits his son, Connor, who reveals that he knows that Angel is his father; his old memories are now "mixed in" with his new ones, and he understands and appreciates why Angel gave him new memories. Lindsey spends the day with Eve, who is suspicious of Angel even though Lindsey now trusts him. Gunn spends his day helping Anne at the homeless shelter that she maintains. Spike goes to a seedy bar, where he drinks heavily and recites poetry onstage. Wesley spends his day in his apartment tending to Illyria's wounds, telling her there is nothing else he wants and nowhere for him to be. When Illyria asks why he will not let her comfort him in Fred's form, Wesley admits that even though he loves and misses Fred, he must face the harsh reality of Fred's death in order to survive.

The team splits up to attack members of the Circle separately, making plans to reunite if they survive their missions. As they leave, Lorne tells Angel that this is the last thing he will do for him as he is leaving for good. Gunn, Spike, and Illyria kill their targets; Lindsey and Lorne wipe out the Sahvrin clan. Then, on Angel's order, Lorne executes Lindsey and then leaves, traumatized by his ordeal. Wesley is killed as he knocks out Cyrus Vail; as he dies, a devastated Illyria comforts him in Fred's guise, then kills Vail when he regains consciousness.

Hamilton, warned of the plan by Harmony, confronts Angel – intent on stopping his plan to kill the Circle's leader. Angel reveals that he had already anticipated Harmony's betrayal and has already poisoned Archduke Sebassis. The two begin their struggle; Angel is losing his fight with Hamilton, until Connor arrives to join the fight. Hamilton proudly announces that the power of the Senior Partners courses through his veins, prompting Angel to assume vampiric form and drink his blood – acquiring enough of Hamilton's strength to defeat him. Expecting a swift counterattack from the Senior Partners as the building begins to collapse, Angel directs Connor to leave; then heads to rendezvous with his surviving allies.

An army of supernatural creatures descends on Angel, Spike, Illyria and a wounded Gunn. As the episode (and series) ends, the four prepare to battle and Angel declares, "Let's go to work."

Production details 

In the scene in which Mercedes McNab is in bed with Adam Baldwin's character, plastic inserts in her bra are clearly visible as she turns to the side. Jeffrey Bell jokes in the DVD commentary that she is "not a special effect," that she is quite real, despite the digitally added fake blood on her lip.

Writing 
Joss Whedon says of this episode, "This was not the final grace note after a symphony, the way the Buffy finale was. We are definitely still in the thick of it. But the point of the show is that you're never done; no matter who goes down, the fight goes on." Whedon says that Angel is about redemption, "something you fight for every day, so I wanted him to go out fighting. People kept calling it a cliffhanger. I was like, 'Are you mad, sir? Don't you see that that is the final statement?'"

Producer David Fury agrees, saying it was "the perfect way to end the series, and anybody who says otherwise is dumb." The central theme of Angel, Fury explains, is that "the fight never ends...You can't ever win but the fight is worth fighting. Any proper resolution of, 'Oh, we've defeated the demons, they've gone back to hell, let's get a beer,' just would have been absolutely wrong for that show."  Part of Angel's story, Fury says, is that "everybody that he's ever been close to dies...he will always outlive the people he cares about."

Acting 
Christian Kane could not be on set for the final episode, so all the Lindsey scenes in this episode were written and shot about a month in advance.  Kane says that he was unhappy with the way his character ended the season, but mostly because the series ending came as a shock and "we’ve all just now gotten comfortable in our skin."

Alexis Denisof, whose character was also killed in this episode, says that he "couldn't think of anything more fitting...the perfect human death of a human life." Joss Whedon says he wouldn't have killed Wesley if the series hadn't been canceled, but that scene ended up being "one of my favorite moments that we shot... If you're going to go out, go out hard."

Joss Whedon quashed the rumors that Sarah Michelle Gellar would appear as Buffy in an interview with TV Guide, saying he did not want the finale to "revolve around a guest star."  He added that "I want to end the show with the people who've been in the trenches together, the characters who have lived - and occasionally died - together." Writer Jeffrey Bell elaborates, saying Gellar was intended to appear in the penultimate episode of Angel but couldn't make it due to other commitments. By the time the producers learned she was available for the finale, Bell says, "to force her into the very last episode to reread stuff that we already dealt with didn't make any sense."

Arc significance 
 In the final episode of the series, Angel and the team make their stand against the Senior Partners and assassinate the Circle of the Black Thorn.
 In this episode the audience learns that Connor did indeed remember his past during "Origin."
 As Wesley dies he asks Illyria to lie to him, which mirrors a conversation Buffy has with Giles in the Buffy episode "Lie to Me" after a friend of hers has died. Illyria poses as Fred and tells him she loves him and they will be together soon. He also dies in the arms of Fred, just as Fred died in his arms in the episode "A Hole in the World."
 The dragon Angel wishes to slay at the end of this episode turns out to be an ally in "After the Fall". Angel says that the dragon was deceived by Wolfram & Hart, and that he realized this not long into their fight.
 David Boreanaz and Christian Kane are the only actors to appear in both the first and last episodes of Angel as well as the 100th episode.
 Angel mentioned that he will miss Buffy from the first day he met her. Angel met Buffy in the pilot episode of Buffy, seven years earlier.

Continuity 
 Spike takes Angel's advice to "live the day as if it were his last" quite literally, as the poem he reads is a completed form of the poem that was originally read on his last day before being sired by Drusilla. This poem was introduced in Buffy Season 5's "Fool for Love." Unlike in the past, the people at the bar, who are all bikers and a rougher crowd, like the poem. The completed poem reads:
My soul is wrapped in harsh repose
Midnight descends in raven colored clothes
But soft, behold! A sunlight beam
Cutting a swath of glimmering gleam
My heart expands, 'tis grown a bulge in't,
Inspired by your beauty effulgent
 Gunn chooses to spend his last day helping Anne, last seen in "The Thin Dead Line". Anne, played by Julia Lee, is a character who has sporadically appeared in both Buffy and Angel since Buffy'''s second season.
 Before the end battle, Gunn says "Okay, you take the thirty thousand on the left…" This may be a reference to "Over the Rainbow" in which Gunn, when confronted by a gang of Pyleans, sarcastically quips, "I'll take the twenty on the left, you take the fifty on the right."
 During the moment in Angel's office where the team all agree to fight, the "Hero" theme is heard for the first and only time since Season 1 Episode 9. Like Doyle, each member of the team are now sacrificing their lives for the good fight which is reflected in this theme.

 Cultural references 
 The episode title is perhaps a reference to a Buddy Holly song. The title could also be a reference to a famous line from Neil Young's song My My, Hey Hey (Out of the Blue): "It's better to burn out than to fade away", since Angel and his crew opt to possibly die in a blaze of glory fighting against Wolfram & Hart rather than be worn down over time by their machinations.
 Jesus Christ: When preparing for the final battle, Angel says, "this may come out a little pretentious, but one of you will betray me." In the same conversation after Angel says that it's not Spike, Spike asks, "Can I deny you three times?" Both are references to the Last Supper and The Crucifixion involving Judas' betrayal of Jesus and of Peter denying three times that he knows Jesus during his arrest.
 Legion (demon): With his last words, Marcus Hamilton, Angel's connection with the senior partners, tells Angel that he cannot win his war against Wolfram & Hart for Hamilton states: "We are Legion, we are forever." which is a reference from Mark 5:9 and Luke 8:30 in the Bible, when the devils (demons) refer to themselves as "Legion."

 Reception and reviews 
At the time of its initial airing, the episode garnered mixed reactions from both critics and fans. It appeared on Zap2it's list of the worst series finales because "we never saw the end of the fight." E! News quoted another fan as saying, "Well, that was the best first half of a season finale ever...what happened to part two?" A different criticism came from essayist Roz Kaveney, who argued that this episode was a classic example of "'Superhero Exceptionalism', the idea that superheroes are exempt from normal considerations and entitled to ignore consequences." The characters' attempt at redemption via a "single gratuitous heroic act of defiance", Kaveney felt, was contrary to Angel's message that redemption was only earned "one day at a time, by slow increments".

Over time however, "Not Fade Away" has come to receive critical acclaim, and is now sometimes referred to as one of the best series finales of all time. The Futon Critic named it the 4th best television episode of 2004, saying, "The series finale was filled with tons of great "holy shit" moments - Illyria's reaction to Wesley's death alone should be required watching for everyone - but the closing moments cut right to the heart of what the show has always been about: the good fight (and the quest for redemption itself) is always a constant struggle." A Huffington Post article about series finales cites it as "one of the few dramas that ended in a way that felt emotionally, tonally and thematically appropriate." In IGN's full series review, they say it "stands as one of the best final episodes of any show ever", and an article on Indiewire also placed it on their list of the best series finales. The episode was also nominated for a 2005 Hugo Award in the category of "Best Dramatic Presentation: Short Form". Matt Roush of TV Guide'' praised the series finale, finding it "incredibly inspiring" that Angel continues to seek redemption despite signing away the reward promised by the Shanshu Prophecy.  "The series retired with dignity, integrity — and, yes, soul", Roush writes.

Cast and crew's thoughts on the finale 

Creator Joss Whedon says "That ain't a cliff. I understand why people would want closure, but for me, that would be like adding a cliff note to the end. What I always wanted to say is, trying to become worthy of the life that you have is a life's work. The fight is for always."
Actor Boreanaz says he is "comfortable with the way they're ending it. It's very open-ended [and] goes out fighting."

References

External links 

 

Angel (season 5) episodes
American television series finales
2004 American television episodes
Television episodes written by Joss Whedon
Apocalyptic television episodes